A Barbanza is a comarca in the province of A Coruña, Galicia, Spain. Its capital is the municipality of Ribeira. The comarca contains four municipalities and 66,095 inhabitants (2019) in an area of 244.2 km². These municipalities are:

 A Pobra do Caramiñal
 Boiro
 Rianxo
 Ribeira

References

A Barbanza